Georg Stumpf (born 14 September 1972) is an Austrian builder and real estate investor. In 1994, he founded the Stumpf Group.

He was born in the family of Georg Stumpf senior, a wealthy entrepreneur and friend of the former Federal Chancellor Franz Vranitzky. Later his father gave Georg Stumpf Jr. a start-up of 1 million shillings. With the support of the banking consortium consisting of Creditanstalt and a Commerzbank subsidiary, Stumpf invested in building the Millenium Tower in Vienna. In 2003, the tower was sold to German fund MCP for 145 million euros. The Millennium Tower is the highest building in Vienna (202 meters). However,  while building it, Stumpf disregarded a number of rules. Initially, the authorities allowed the tower to be only 140 meters high; however, they had to agree to the final version of the project once it was over. Moreover, Stumpf wrested huge price reductions from the construction companies with the promise not to make any deductions due to possible construction defects at the final inspection.

Later they also joined forces with the Russian oligarch Viktor Vekselberg to hijack other companies and reorganize the industrial group in Switzerland. After the collapse of the  Oerlikon due to the financial crisis of 2007–2008, Stumpf received the Exyte group.

In his spare time, Stumpf enjoys playing golf, and he even won several junior championship titles in Austria.

Georg Stumpf made the 2022 Forbes Billionaires List with an estimated wealth of $8.1 billion and occupied the 288th position.

References 

1972 births
Living people
Austrian businesspeople
Austrian billionaires
20th-century Austrian businesspeople
21st-century Austrian businesspeople